The Golden Bell Award for Best Visual Effects for a Drama Series is one of the categories of the competition for Taiwanese television production, Golden Bell Awards. It was introduced in 2022.

Winners

2020s

References

Visual Effects for a Drama Series, Best
Golden Bell Awards, Best Visual Effects for a Drama Series